Woodball at the 2008 Asian Beach Games was held from 18 October to 22 October 2008 in Bali, Indonesia.

Medalists

Medal table

Results

Men's singles
18–22 October

Men's team
18–21 October

Women's singles
18–22 October

Women's team
18–21 October

References
 Official site
 Results

2008 Asian Beach Games events
2008